The 1972 St. Louis Cardinals season was the team's 53rd year with the National Football League and thirteenth in St. Louis. On September 2, Bill Bidwill purchased the stock of his brother Charles "Stormy" Bidwill to become sole owner of the Cardinals. The adopted sons of Charles and Violet Bidwill, the two had co-owned the team since their mother's death in January 1962.

After starting at 2–2, with wins over 1970 and 1971 playoff participants Baltimore and Minnesota, the Cardinals went 0–7–1, then won their final two games over the Rams and Eagles to finish at 4–9–1 for the second consecutive season and third time in the past four.

Second-year head coach Bob Hollway was fired on December 18, the day after the regular season finale, and succeeded a month later by San Diego State head coach Don Coryell.

Offseason

NFL Draft

Roster

Regular season

Schedule

Standings

Awards and records

References 

 Cardinals on Pro Football Reference
 Cardinals on jt-sw.com

St. Louis
Arizona Cardinals seasons